Geoff Elliott (born 6 August 1939) is a former Australian rules footballer who played with Fitzroy in the Victorian Football League (VFL).

References

External links 
		

Living people
1939 births
Australian rules footballers from Victoria (Australia)
Fitzroy Football Club players